Aberystwyth Town Women's F.C. is a football team, playing in the Adran Premier, which they were founder members of in 2009.

The club plays its home matches at Park Avenue, Aberystwyth, which has a capacity of 5,000.

The team's first choice strip is green and black striped shirts with black shorts and green socks. The second choice strip is yellow shirts with black trim, green shorts and socks.

History
Founder members of the Women's Welsh Premier League in 2009, Aberystwyth Town were an ever-present part of the league until they were relegated at the end of the 2016–2017 season. After two seasons in the second tier of Women's Welsh football, Aberystwyth Town were promoted back to the Welsh Premier League for the 2019–2020 season.

They reached the semi-finals of the FAW Women's Cup in 2010/11, losing 4-1 to Caernarfon Town.

In 2022/23, they reached two cup semi-finals, losing to Cardiff Met 3-1 in the Genero Adran Trophy, and to Briton Ferry Llansawel 3-0 in the FAW Women's Cup.

Current squad

Staff

References

External links 
 Official website

Women's football clubs in Wales
Welsh Premier Women's Football League clubs
Sport in Aberystwyth

bg:ФК Абъристуит Таун
cy:C.P.D. Tref Aberystwyth
de:Aberystwyth Town
es:Aberystwyth Town Football Club
fr:Aberystwyth Town Football Club
it:Aberystwyth Town Football Club
lt:Aberystwyth Town FC
hu:Aberystwyth Town FC
nl:Aberystwyth Town FC
no:Aberystwyth Town FC
ro:Aberystwyth Town FC
ru:Аберистуит Таун
simple:Aberystwyth Town F.C.